Jericho is a suburb of the town of Kadina on the Yorke Peninsula. It is located in the Copper Coast Council. The boundaries were formally gazetted in January 1999, although the name had long been in use for the area. It was surveyed in 1871 as one of four "occupation blocks" to meet high demand for housing near Wallaroo Mines.

References

Towns in South Australia